Gateway Gardens is an underground railway station  east of Frankfurt Airport in Germany. It is between Frankfurt Stadion station and Frankfurt Airport regional station on lines S8 and S9 of the Rhine-Main S-Bahn commuter network.

Construction

A new tunnel was constructed under A5 motorway and Bundesstraße 43, with a new bridge over the Main Railway so that the existing Frankfurt Airport loop services could be diverted via the new station.  The station has two tracks with an island platform inside a station box constructed using cut and cover.

Opening
An opening ceremony was held on 9 December 2019, with public services beginning in the early hours of 15 December 2019—originally planned for 00:17, but delayed until shortly after 01:30.

References

External links

 

Railway stations located underground in Frankfurt
Rhine-Main S-Bahn stations
Railway stations in Germany opened in 2019